Henry Gold may refer to:

Henry Golde (born 1929), Polish author
Henry Gold Danforth (1854–1918), American politician
Henry Gold (photographer) (born c. 1934), Australian photographer

See also
Harry Gold (disambiguation)
Henry Golding (disambiguation)